The Ludovisi Throne is an ancient sculpted block of white marble hollowed at the back and carved with bas-reliefs on the three outer faces (it is not actually a throne for sitting on). Its authenticity is debated; the majority, who accept it, place it as Western Greek from Magna Graecia and date it from the Severe style it manifests (transitional between Archaic and Early Classical) to the period about 460 BCE. The Ludovisi Throne has been conserved at the Museo Nazionale Romano of Palazzo Altemps, Rome, since its purchase for the Italian State in 1894.

Description

The central relief is most customarily read as Aphrodite rising from the sea, a motif known as Venus Anadyomene (height 0.9 m, length 1.42 m). The goddess, in clinging diaphanous draperies, is helped by two attendant Horae standing on the shore, who prepared to veil her with a cloth they jointly hold, which hides her from the waist down. The two reliefs on the flanking sides discreetly turn their backs to the mystery of the central subject. The right relief shows a crouching veiled woman who offers incense from a thymiaterion held in her left hand, in an incense burner on a stand.  The right slab's dimensions are height 0.87 m, length 0.69 m. The other shows a young nude girl, seated with one knee thrown over the other who plays the double flute called the aulos; her hair is bound in a kerchief. The dimensions of the left slab are height 0.84 m, length 0.68 m.

The iconography of the subject is without a parallel in Antiquity, thus the very subject of the relief is in doubt. Alternative views, since the flanking attendants stand on pebbled ground, have been offered: that the emerging figure is that of the ritual robing of a chthonic goddess, probably Persephone, rising from a cleft in the earth (Pandora is similarly shown in Attic vase-paintings) or of Hera emerging reborn from the waters of Kanathos near Tiryns as Hera Parthenos.

Doubts

The only other representations of the female nude at this period (c. 460) are on Attic pottery. Criticisms of anomalies in anatomy and detail and doubts of the Ludovisi Throne's authenticity were summed up by Jerome Eisenberg in a 1996 article in Minerva, which asserted, in part, that the hetaira flute-player was derived from a late-sixth-century BCE psykter by Euphronius, published in 1857 in the Hermitage from the Campana collection.  Eisenberg noted that the much-later Roman representation of Penelope mourning for Odysseus is the only iconological type in classical sculpture which depicts a woman with legs crossed: the Penelope is fully clothed. Penelope awaiting (along with Telemachus) for Odysseus' return to Ithaca is depicted with legs crossed (left leg over right leg, viewed from the left) on an Attic red-figure skyphos from Chiusi, dated ca. 440 BCE.

Provenance
The Throne was found in 1887, in the formerly extensive grounds of the Villa Ludovisi, Rome, where the ancient gardens of Sallust had been located.  It was moved into the Villa Ludovisi, whence the name. The Ludovisi are a papal family who have been patrons and collectors since the early seventeenth century. Financial difficulties forced a sale of the Ludovisi collections to the Italian State in 1894. The Villa Ludovisi grounds were broken into lots, streets put through and the district developed and unalterably changed.  Conclusions about the object's original purpose, the meaning of its reliefs and its place of facture are all debated, but in 1982 it was securely linked to a newly studied temple at Marasà, near Locri, in Calabria, an Ionic temple of Aphrodite that was rebuilt internally in 480 BCE. A reconstruction of the throne was shown to fit exactly into remaining blocks in the temple's foundations, and it has been suggested that terracotta votive plaques, or pinakes, of cults at Lokri Epizefiri, are the only stylistic parallel to the Throne.

Boston Throne
The Ludovisi Throne's less accomplished twin, the Boston Throne in the Museum of Fine Arts, Boston, which appeared in 1894, shortly after the Ludovisi auction and was bought by the connoisseur Edward Perry Warren, who donated it to Boston, is widely doubted. A conference at Palazzo Grassi, Venice, 1996, compared the two objects. If it is not a forgery of c. 1894, it may be a Roman sculpture designed to complete the Greek one in a setting in the gardens of Sallust. Thomas Hoving, once director of the Metropolitan Museum of Art, recollects being told by an art dealer in Italy  that the twin throne in Boston was the work of the great faker Alceo Dossena.

Notes

References

Melissa M. Terras, 1997. "The Ludovisi and Boston Throne: a Comparison" A thorough website entirely devoted to the Ludovisi Throne and the Boston Throne.
Kim J. Hartswick, 2004. The Gardens of Sallust. A Changing Landscape   (Austin, TX:  University of Texas Press) A first exploration of the gardens and the site of the Villa Ludovisi.
H. H. Powers, 1923. "The 'Ludovisi Throne' and the Boston Relief" The Art Bulletin, 5.4 (June 1923), pp 102–108.
Bernard Ashmole and William J. Young, 1968. "The Boston Relief and the Ludovisi Throne", Bulletin of the Museum of Fine Arts, 66 no. 346, pp 124–66.

5th-century BC Greek sculptures
Collections of the National Roman Museum
Ludovisi collection
Sculpture forgeries